Moisés Villarroel Angulo (born 7 September 1998 in Santa Cruz de la Sierra, Bolivia) is a Bolivian footballer who plays as a midfielder for Wilstermann.

Club career
Villarroel began his football career at the youth ranks of hometown club Blooming at age 10. He made his top flight debut on May 26, 2013 during a league match against Petrolero under manager Néstor Clausen. During his spell at Blooming he had 20 appearances in the Liga de Fútbol Profesional Boliviano and scored one goal. Due to his impressive performance at such a young age, in July 2015 he signed for Universidad de Chile.

International career
In March 2015, Villarroel participated with the Bolivia U17 national team in the South American U-17 championship in Paraguay, but the squad did not qualify to the FIFA U-17 World Cup held later that year.

He was named in Bolivia's senior squad for a 2018 FIFA World Cup qualifier against Venezuela in November 2015.

Statistics

Club

International
Scores and results list Bolivia's goal tally first.

References

External links

1998 births
Living people
Association football midfielders
Bolivian footballers
Bolivian Primera División players
Club Blooming players
Universidad de Chile footballers
2021 Copa América players
Expatriate footballers in Chile
Bolivian expatriate footballers
Bolivian expatriate sportspeople in Chile
Sportspeople from Santa Cruz de la Sierra
Bolivia youth international footballers